Justice Wilbur may refer to:

Curtis D. Wilbur, chief justice of the Supreme Court of California
George A. Wilbur, associate justice of the Rhode Island Supreme Court
Lori S. Wilbur, associate justice of the South Dakota Supreme Court

See also
Isaac Wilbour, associate justice and acting chief justice of the Rhode Island Supreme Court